Gorbusha may refer to:
Gorbusha, Moscow Oblast, a settlement in Moscow Oblast, Russia
Gorbusha, Vologda Oblast, a village in Vologda Oblast, Russia
Gorbusha, a former settlement in Primorsky Krai, Russian SFSR; now a part of the town of Dalnegorsk

See also
Gorbushka, a market place in Moscow